University of Douala, or Université de Douala (UDla), is located in Douala in Cameroon. 
The University of Douala is one of the eight public universities of Cameroon.

History 
The current structure of the University of Douala was established in 1993. The university incorporated the previous University Centre (Centre universitaire established in 1977) which was made of the Ecole Supérieure des Sciences Economiques et Commerciales (ESSEC established in 1977) and the Ecole Normale d'Enseignement Technique (ENSET established in 1979) and which was transformed into a university in 1992.

The university has around 40.000 students, 600 teachers and around 600 administrators and collaborators.

The University of Douala has six locations in different neighborhoods of the city of Douala:
 Campus Bassa "Cité SIC" where the main campus is located (ecole superieures des sciences economiques et commerciales, faculté des sciences juridiques et commerciales, faculté des sciences economiques, faculté de genie industrielle, faculté de medecine)
 Campus Ndogbong (institut universitaire de technologie, ecole normale d'enseignement technique)
 Campus Akwa (Ecole doctorale)
 Nkongsamba
 Yabassi
 Logbessou (construction started in 2011)

The university provides training in economics and commerce, technical training, industrial engineering, medicine and pharmaceutics, arts, fisheries science, humanities, law and politics, sciences, economic sciences and management.

The university is partner of the AUF Agence Universitaire de la Francophonie, AUA Association des Universités Africaines (the association of African universities), AIU
Association Internationale des Universités (the international association of universities), ACU the Association of Commonwealth Universities, AIEA Agence Internationale de l'Energie Atomique (the international agency of atomic energy), CAMES Conseil Africain et Malgache pour l'Enseignement Supérieur (the African and Malagasy Council of Higher Education), UNESCO the United Nations of Education, Science and Cultural Organisation and CRUROR/AC Conférence des Recteurs des Universités et des Responsables des Organismes de Recherche d'Afrique Centrale (the conference of the directors of universities and research institutes of central Africa).

References

External links
  University of Douala official site
Douala University campus on track

Douala
Douala
Educational institutions established in 1977
1977 establishments in Cameroon